The inline hockey competition at the 2017 World Games took place from 25 to 29 July 2017, in Wroclaw, Poland.

Medalists

Preliminary round

Group A

Group B

Playoff round

Semifinals

Seventh place game

Fifth place game

Bronze medal game

Gold medal game

Final standings

References

External links
 Results book

2017 World Games
2017
World Games